The Department of Public Works and Infrastructure (DPWI; formerly the Department of Public Works) is one of the ministries of the South African government. It is responsible for public infrastructure as well as providing accommodation and property management services to all the other ministries of the South African government. It is also responsible for promoting the national Expanded Public Works Programme and for encouraging the transformation of the construction and property industries in South Africa.

In 2014 a spokesperson for the official opposition, David Maynier of the DA, described the department as "monumentally incompetent", and asked that it be kicked out of the SANDF. Secretary of Defence Sam Gulube said that the SANDF experienced a repair and maintenance backlog of some R8 to R13 billion, and that maintenance underspending by the department amounted to R1.6 billion over the years 2012 to 2014.

In March 2022 nine state department buildings in Pretoria were closed and their essential services interrupted when the department fell in arrears with its rent payments and allegedly owed R124 million. The department blamed the landlord, Bothongo Group, of rent that was not market related, while the group countered that the department was "a nest of corruption", which has no complaints when bribes are paid. Questions were also raised about noncontractual rent payments by the department to Armscor.

Branches
Policy
Expanded Public Works Programme
Asset Management
Finance and Procurement
Operations
Human Resource Management
Information Technology

References

External links
 

Public Works
South Africa
South Africa